The Military Cathedral of St. Mary Queen of Peace (also Military Cathedral of Brasília) is a Roman Catholic church in the city of Brasilia, the capital of Brazil.

It is located on the west side, between the N1 and S1 tracks of the Monumental Axis, close to the Urban Military Sector (SMU).

It was designed by the Brazilian architect Oscar Niemeyer and inaugurated on September 12, 1994. It belongs to the Military Ordinariate of Brazil and has as archbishop Osvino José Both.

Its architecture in triangular format refers to a tent. Pope John Paul II laid the foundation stone in 1991 during his visit to Brazil.

See also
Roman Catholicism in Brazil
Military Ordinariate of Brazil

References

Roman Catholic cathedrals in Brasília
Roman Catholic churches in Brasília
Roman Catholic churches completed in 1994
1994 establishments in Brazil
20th-century Roman Catholic church buildings in Brazil